Nuno Miguel Reis Lima (born 16 March 2001) is a Portuguese professional footballer who plays as a centre-back for the club Paços de Ferreira.

Professional career
A youth product of Anta, Porto, Paços de Ferreira, and Feirense, Lima signed his first senior contract with Paços de Ferreira in 2020 and was promptly loaned to Felgueiras. He returned to in 2021, where he worked his way up to the senior team. He made his professional debut with Paços de Ferreira in a 2-1 Taça da Liga loss to Boavista on 23 September 2021.

References

External links
 
 

2001 births
Living people
Footballers from Porto
Portuguese footballers
F.C. Paços de Ferreira players
F.C. Felgueiras 1932 players
Primeira Liga players
Campeonato de Portugal (league) players
Association football defenders